A cat lady is a cultural archetype or stock character, most often depicted as a woman, a middle-aged or elderly spinster or widow, who has many cats. The term may be pejorative, or it may be affectionately embraced.

Usage and association
Women who have cats have long been associated with the concept of spinsterhood, widowhood or even witchcraft. In more recent decades, the concept of a cat lady has been associated with "romance-challenged (often career-oriented) women". Specifically, it has also been embraced by lesbians.

A cat lady may also be an animal hoarder who keeps large numbers of cats without having the ability to properly house or care for them. They may be ignorant about their situation, or generally unaware of their situation. People who are aware of it are not normally considered cat ladies.

Depending on context, the ordinarily pejorative word "crazy" may be prepended to "cat lady" to indicate either a pejorative or a humorous and affectionate label. Some writers, celebrities, and artists have challenged the  gender-based "Crazy Cat Lady" stereotype, and embraced the term to mean an animal lover or rescuer who cares for one or multiple cats, and who is psychologically healthy.

A 2019 study found no differences between cat owners and non-cat owners for anxiety, depression or experiences in relationships: "We suggest that our findings are, therefore, not consistent with a description of cat-owners as depressed, anxious or as having difficulty with human relationships." However, a separate 1983 study found that pet owners tended to score higher than non-owners on social sensitivity and interpersonal trust, though there was no appreciative difference between dog and cat owners.

Documentary
The documentary Cat Ladies (2009) tells the stories of four women whose lives became dedicated to their cats. The film was directed by Christie Callan-Jones and produced by Chocolate Box Entertainment, originally for TVOntario. It was an official selection at the 2009 Hot Docs Festival, Silverdocs Festival, and San Francisco's DocFest.

Naftali Berrill, Ph.D., Director of the New York Center for Neuropsychology and Forensic Behavioral Science, told AOL Health, "These may be people who have a very hard time expressing themselves to other people. They may find the human need for affection is met most easily through a relationship with a pet." This devotion can sometimes signal mental or emotional issues such as depression.

Toxoplasma gondii
Some studies indicate a link between the parasite Toxoplasma gondii, which sexually reproduces exclusively in cats, and numerous psychiatric conditions, including obsessive compulsive disorder (OCD) and schizophrenia, 
whereas other studies have showed that T. gondii is not a causative factor in later psychoses.

The compulsive hoarding of cats, a symptom of obsessive compulsive disorder (OCD), has long been associated with "crazy cat ladies". Mass media has drawn on this stereotype to coin the term crazy cat lady syndrome to refer to the association between T. gondii and psychiatric conditions.

Notable examples
 Florence Nightingale had many cats named after famous public figures such as Gladstone and Bismarck.
 Edith Ewing Bouvier and her daughter Edith Bouvier Beale had many cats living with them in their decrepit home Grey Gardens. Reportedly, some 30 cats lived in the house by the time Little Edie sold it in 1979.
 Bertha Rand was Winnipeg's notorious Cat Lady, who for years battled her neighbours and city hall to save her dozens of cats. Even years after her death, she still holds a place in Canadian popular culture. Maureen Hunter's play The Queen of Queen Street is based on Rand's life.

Cultural references
Cat ladies in popular culture include:

General
 Catwoman:  A recurring supervillain or anti-hero character that most often appears in the Batman franchise in comics, films and television.

Television
 In the Adventures of Superman episode "Olsen's Millions" has Jimmy Olsen receiving a reward for rescuing a cat belonging to Mrs. Peabody (portrayed by Elizabeth Patterson), a Metropolis cat lady.
 "Grandma Puggy" (portrayed by Steve Martin) is a widowed grandmother who had cats everywhere and whose hair got on the guests. She was also mentioned in a Saturday Night Live "Wayne's World" sketch by Garth (portrayed by Dana Carvey) who trick-or-treated at the house of "some weird old lady who had about a gazillion cats and their hair got on my candy apple".
 In Codename: Kids Next Door, the Crazy Old Cat Lady (voiced by Grey DeLisle) is a half-human half-feline villain who lives with thousands of black and white cats and possesses the power to control them.
 In the CSI: Crime Scene Investigation episode "Cats in the Cradle", a cat lady named Ruth Elliot (portrayed by Ellen Geer) is revealed to have been murdered by a young girl named Jessica Trent (portrayed by Courtney Jines) after she and her sister Jackie (portrayed by Jennette McCurdy) wanted a cat which Ruth was unwilling to part with as she considered it one of her children.
 Angela Martin is a character on The Office who is a cat lady.
 In The Simpsons, the Crazy Cat Lady (voiced by Tress MacNeille) is a recurring character whose real name is Eleanor Abernathy.
 In the Disney Channel series The Suite Life on Deck, schoolteacher Emma Tutweiller (Erin Cardillo) has 30 cats in her cabin.
 Jefferson (portrayed by Tyler, The Creator) from the Adult Swim TV series Loiter Squad is a cat person.
 In Futurama, Hattie McDoogal (voiced by Tress MacNeille) is an old woman who lives alone with her cats and often uses nonsense words and phrases, such as "kerjigger". She briefly serves as the landlady of Fry and Bender, and holds a single share of Planet Express, allowing her the decisive vote for its CEO. She has been married twice, surviving both of them, and often dates. She once hired Kif Kroker as a male escort. MacNeille also voices the Crazy Cat Lady on The Simpsons.
 In The Loud House, Rita Loud's aunt Ruth (voiced by Grey DeLisle) is a cat lady.
 In Crazy Ex-Girlfriend, the episode "Trent?!" features a musical number where the main character Rebecca and her friends make jokes about being cat ladies after Rebecca cuts off her sexual relationship.

Film
 In a key scene in A Clockwork Orange (1971), the violent sociopath Alex DeLarge murders a paranoid cat lady, for which he is convicted and sentenced to a prison term during which he undergoes behavioral training to become a vastly different person.
 In the black comedy The End (1978), Sally Field portrays Burt Reynolds' distracted cat lady girlfriend Mary Ellen, who is too absorbed in her feline pets to react to Burt's news that he is dying.
 In a scene in Tim Burton's Batman Returns (1992) after being pushed to her breaking point by Max Schreck, Selina Kyle (portrayed by Michelle Pfeiffer) transforms from a cat lady into Catwoman.
 In Catwoman (2004), Patience Phillips (portrayed by Halle Berry) visits a cat lady who tells her about how to embrace her new identity as Catwoman, claiming an Egyptian Mau called Midnight chose to give her cat-like superpowers.
 In The Lego Movie (2014), Mrs. Scratchen-Post is a cat lady minifigure who is one of Emmet Brickowski's neighbors.
 In Free Guy, the video game Free City has a cat lady named Phyllis (portrayed by Anabel Graetz) where she needs help from the players to find her cats. After Free Life was established at the end of the film, Phyllis was among the Free City NPCs living in the game as she is seen with her cats that are in the basket that Dude is holding.
 In Puss in Boots: The Last Wish, when Puss in Boots is informed that he has one life left, he retreats to live in the house of cat lady Mama Luna.

Music
 On Venetian Snares's album Songs About My Cats (2001), he features a song called "For Bertha Rand." The album features many samples of cats which are worked into Aaron's distinct break-core style of old-school jungle music.

Games
 The Cat Lady (2012) is a psychological horror adventure game developed by Remigiusz Michalski.
 In The Sims 3s "Pets" expansion pack, there is a new town called "Appaloosa Plains", and one of the many residents in the town is an elderly woman with lots of cats. The household may be somewhat challenging, as the player has to care for all those cats and fulfill the Sims' own wishes and needs as well. If the cats are not properly cared for and fed, then they may all be taken away.

Events
 CatCon, an event described as "The convention with cattitude", hosted seminars featuring actor Ian Somerhalder and actress Mayim Bialik, meet and greets with celebrity cats Lil BUB and Nala, and an adoption village where visitors can meet and adopt a cat or kitten.
 National Cat Lady Day is celebrated April 19, as a way to debunk the myth that cat ladies are dowdy spinsters. "Now it's chic to be a cat lady!" said CatCon creator Susan Michals.

See also
 Think Think and Ah Tsai
 Cat people and dog people

References

External links

Cats
Stereotypes of women
Feminism and society
Pejorative terms for women
Female stock characters
Cats in popular culture